Norris Denton "Norro" Wilson (April 4, 1938 – June 8, 2017) was an American country music singer-songwriter, producer, and member of the Nashville Songwriters Hall of Fame.

Wilson wrote or co-wrote numerous hit songs during more than 40 years in the industry, including songs for David Houston, Jean Shepard, Charlie Rich, Charley Pride, George Jones, and Tammy Wynette, among many others. He also produced or co-produced songs for dozens of artists, including early Reba McEntire, Joe Stampley, Margo Smith, Sara Evans, Kenny Chesney, and Shania Twain.

Earlier in his career, Wilson also charted ten singles on the Billboard magazine Hot Country Songs chart. The biggest of his three Top 40 hits was "Do It to Someone You Love" (written by Tom T. Hall) which reached No. 20 in 1970. He also recorded two songs, "Hey, Mister!" and "Mama McClusky", that were the basis for Charlie Rich's 1973 number one song, "The Most Beautiful Girl".

He died on June 8, 2017, in Nashville from heart failure.

Discography

Albums

Singles

Awards and recognition
 1975 Grammy Award (with Billy Sherrill, songwriters) for Best Country Song, "A Very Special Love Song"
 1996 Inductee into the Nashville Songwriters Hall of Fame
 2008 Inducted into Kentucky Music Hall of Fame
 2018 Academy of Country Music Poet's Award

References

Hight, Michael. "Norro Wilson". In The Encyclopedia of Country Music. Paul Kingsbury, Editor. New York: Oxford University Press. 1998. p. 596.
Hyatt, Wesley. The Billboard Book of No. 1 Adult Contemporary Hits. New York: Billboard Publications. 1999.
Roland, Tom, "The Billboard Book of Number One Country Hits" (Billboard Books, Watson-Guptill Publications, New York), 1991

External links
 Nashville Songwriters Foundation Hall of Fame — Norro Wilson
 

1938 births
2017 deaths
American country singer-songwriters
People from Scottsville, Kentucky
Country musicians from Kentucky
American country record producers
Smash Records artists
Singer-songwriters from Kentucky
Record producers from Kentucky
20th-century American singers
Country musicians from Tennessee
Singer-songwriters from Tennessee